Unsere Liebe Frau im Walde-St. Felix is a comune (municipality) in South Tyrol in northern Italy, located about  west of the city of Bolzano.

Geography

The municipality of Unsere Liebe Frau im Walde-St. Felix contains the villages St. Felix, Unsere Liebe Frau im Walde and the hamlet Malgasott.

Unsere Liebe Frau im Walde-St. Felix borders the following municipalities: Eppan, Nals, St Pankraz, Tisens, Castelfondo, and Fondo.

History

Coat-of-arms
The village has two coat-of-arms regarding the two joined municipalities. The shield is azure with an or square, the sides curved  and the corners decorated with shamrock. The four vertices represent the four original German-speaking municipalities of Non Valley: Laurein, Proveis, Unsere Liebe Frau im Walde and St. Felix. The first emblem represents a church, the second St. Felix with a palm in the left hand and a book in the right. The emblem was adopted in 1966.

Anthropologist Eric R. Wolf examined the history of St. Felix in depth in his 1974 study The Hidden Frontier.

Society

Linguistic distribution
According to the 2011 census, 98.95% of the population speak German and 1.05% Italian as first language.

Demographic evolution

References

External links
 Homepage of the municipality

Municipalities of South Tyrol
Nonsberg Group